The Stage Club bombing was a terrorist attack which occurred on February 25, 2005  in which a Palestinian suicide bomber blew himself up outside the "Stage" beachfront nightclub in Tel Aviv, Israel, killing 5 people and injuring 50.

The Palestinian militant organization Islamic Jihad claimed responsibility for the attack.

The attack
On Friday, 25 February 2005, at 11:30 pm, a Palestinian suicide bomber wearing hidden explosives attached to his body, detonated himself in a crowd of young Israelis who were waiting outside a beachfront nightclub near the promenade of Tel Aviv. This was on the corner of Herbert Samuel and Yonah Hanavi streets, opposite the Israeli beachfront. This bombing occurred on February 25, 2005. The blast killed five people and injured more than 50.

Most of the victims belonged to an Israeli army reserve unit that was planning to celebrate the birthday of one of its officers at the nightclub. 

"We're a small and very 'together' unit," later said Yaron Greivsky, whose 30th birthday was the reason for the surprise gathering. "We're the kind who smile when we're called up for reserve service. All of us have been in dangerous places, we've been in Lebanon, Gaza, Hebron, all over. No one was ever hurt. And then a terrorist comes to the middle of Tel Aviv, where it's supposed to be the safest, and destroys everything."

The perpetrators
The Palestinian militant organization Islamic Jihad claimed responsibility for the attack. After the attack the Al-Jazeera network released a video which showed the 21-year-old suicide bomber Abdullah Badran who stated that he carried out the attack in revenge for Israel's actions in West Bank and the Gaza Strip. The attack was praised by The Electronic Intifada.

Abdullah Badran
Abdullah Badran (1983-February 25, 2005) was the Palestinian suicide bomber involved in the attack. Badran was a university student from the village of Deir al-Ghusun near the West Bank town of Tulkarm. His parents claimed he was a devout Muslim, but had no history of militant activity. Badran was twenty-one at the time of his death.

References

External links
Suicide bombing at Tel Aviv Stage Club - published at the Israeli Ministry of Foreign Affairs
Suicide bomber kills 4 in Tel Aviv - published on The Boston Globe on February 26, 2005
Bomb kills clubbers in Tel Aviv - published on BBC News on February 26, 2005
Several dead in Tel Aviv blast - published on The Guardian on February 25, 2005
Voice of America article on the suicide bombing

Mass murder in 2005
Suicide bombing in the Israeli–Palestinian conflict
Terrorist attacks attributed to Palestinian militant groups
Terrorist incidents in Israel in 2005
Terrorist incidents in Tel Aviv
Islamic terrorism in Israel
2000s crimes in Tel Aviv
Attacks on nightclubs
February 2005 events in Asia
Building bombings in Israel
2005 murders in Israel